Jõhvi Concert Hall is a concert hall in Ida-Viru County, Estonia. The hall is managed by Eesti Kontsert.

The hall was opened on 8 October 2005. The hall was designed by architects Ra Luhse and Tanel Tuhal. The hall's acoustics was created by Linda Madalik.

The hall is a place where are located Cinema Amadeus, Jõhvi City Gallery, Jõhvi Music School, Jõhvi Hobby Centre and Café Noot.

References

Concert halls in Estonia
Jõhvi